The Division of Prospect was an Australian Electoral Division in the state of New South Wales from 1969 to 2010. It was located in the western suburbs of Sydney, and included the suburbs of Fairfield, Smithfield, Kemps Creek, St Clair, Horsley Park and those parts of the suburb of Prospect south of the Great Western Highway which were the least populous parts of the suburb. The Prospect Reservoir was located within the Division.

The origins of the Division date back to the redistribution of 21 November 1968, and was first contested at the 1969 Federal election. The seat was a safe Labor seat for its entire existence.

Following the 2009 redistribution of New South Wales, the division was renamed McMahon to honour former Prime Minister Sir William McMahon. McMahon was first contested at the 2010 federal election.

Members

Election results

References

Announcement of renaming
Psephos: Adam Carr's Election Archive
The Poll Bludger
ABC Elections
Australian Electoral Commission

External links
  (PDF, 174 kB)

1969 establishments in Australia
Constituencies established in 1969
Prospect